Face Off  may refer to:

Film and television 
 Face-Off (1971 film), a Canadian hockey romance film
 Face/Off, a 1997 American action film
 Invertigo (roller coaster), a ride in Ohio, formerly known as Face/Off, after the film
 Face Off (American TV series), an American special effects makeup reality competition series
 Face Off (Singaporean talk show), a Singaporean talk show
 "Face Off" (Breaking Bad), a television episode
 "Face-Off" (Gilmore Girls), a television episode
 "Face Off" (Grimm), a television episode

Music 
 Face Off (Bow Wow and Omarion album) or the title song, 2007
 Face Off (Pastor Troy album) or the title song, 2001
 Face Off, a mixtape by Brianna Perry, 2011
 "Face Off", a song by DJ Kay Slay from The Streetsweeper, Vol. 2, 2004
 "Face Off", a song by Jay-Z from In My Lifetime, Vol. 1, 1997
 "Face Off", a song by Reks from Rhythmatic Eternal King Supreme, 2011
 "Face Off", a song by Tech N9ne, from  Asin9ne, 2021

Sports 
 Face-off, an event that starts play in stick sports such as hockey, bandy, and lacrosse
 Face-Off Classic, an annual American college lacrosse event in Baltimore, Maryland

Video games 
 Face Off (video game), a Japan-only 1988 arcade game by Namco
 Face Off!, a 1989 video game by Mindspan